Revolutionary Communist Party (Parti Communiste Revolutionnaire) was a Maoist-oriented communist party in Belgium. PCR published L’Exploité (The Exploited).

In 1982 PCR signed a manifest for “an independent, progressive and democratic Wallonia” together with PCBML and Pour le Socialisme.

Defunct communist parties in Belgium]
Francophone political parties in Belgium
Political parties with year of establishment missing
Political parties with year of disestablishment missing
Maoist organizations in Europe